Alto Molocue District is a district of Zambezia Province in Mozambique. It covers, 6,368 km2 and has a population of, 278,064.

References

Further reading
District profile (PDF)

 
Districts in Zambezia Province